Puna may refer to:

Places

Americas 
 Puña, a town in the Department of Cajamarca of Peru
 Puna, Potosí, a village in Bolivia
 Puna, Hawaii, a district in the east-southeast portion of the Island of Hawaii
 Puná Island, an island off the coast of southern Ecuador
 Battle of Puná, a battle fought between Spanish conquistadors and Puná natives
 Altiplano or Puna, a region that covers part of Bolivia, Peru, and the northern end of Argentina and Chile
 Puna de Atacama, a plateau in the Andes

Asia 
 Pune, or Puna, a city in Maharashtra, India
 Puna, Gujarat, a town in Gujarat, India
 Puna, Pakistan, a village in Punjab, Pakistan

Other uses
 Puna grassland, a type of grassland in the central part of the high Andes
 Puna (mythology), a character in Polynesian mythology
 Maihueniopsis or Puna, a cactus genus

See also 
 Poona (disambiguation)